The 2021 IFSC Climbing World Cup was the 33rd edition of the international sport climbing competition series, held in seven locations. There are 11 events: four bouldering, five lead, and two speed events. The season began on 16 April in Meiringen, Switzerland with the first bouldering competition in the season, and concluded on 4 September in Kranj, Slovenia. The International Federation of Sport Climbing had initially scheduled 18 events concluding on 31 October, but COVID-19 travel restrictions resulted in the cancellation of events in Xiamen and Wujiang in China, Jakarta in Indonesia and Seoul in South Korea.

This season was the first completed IFSC Climbing World Cup series since the 2019 edition, as the 2020 IFSC Climbing World Cup was limited to just one event, the Briançon Lead World Cup in August 2020, due to the pandemic. The opening event in Meiringen was the first Boulder World Cup since the 2019 season. The Boulder World Cup and the Boulder and Speed World Cup scheduled for 21–22 May and 28–30 May, respectively, in Salt Lake City, United States, were the first-ever consecutive IFSC World Cups held in the same city.

The top 3 in each competition receive medals, and the overall winners are awarded trophies. At the end of the season an overall ranking is determined based upon points, which athletes are awarded for finishing in the top 30 of each individual event.

Season winners

Scheduling 
In December 2020, the IFSC moved the 21–22 May Boulder World Cup from Munich, Germany to Salt Lake City, United States, and rescheduled the already existing Boulder & Speed World Cup in Salt Lake City from 11–13 June to 28–30 May, in order to minimize travel for athletes and staff. In March, the federation also moved the Seoul, South Korea and Wujiang, China World Cups from April and May to October because of ongoing COVID-19 related restrictions in the respective countries. In July, the Lead World Cup in Ljubljana, Slovenia was moved to Kranj, Slovenia, and rescheduled from 4–5 to 3–4 September.

In August, the federation cancelled the World Cups in China: the 15–17 October Lead & Speed World Cup in Xiamen and the 22–24 October Boulder & Speed World Cup in Wujiang. In September, the federation also cancelled the 30–31 October Speed World Cup in Jakarta, Indonesia, which had already been postponed from 23 to 24 October. The following week, the IFSC also cancelled the Boulder and Speed World Cup in Seoul, originally scheduled for May and pushed back to October, due to rising COVID-19 cases in South Korea. The cancellation of the Jakarta and Seoul World Cups mean the bouldering and speed seasons concluded in June in Innsbruck and Villars in July, respectively.

Competition highlights 
Because of the cancellations caused by the COVID-19 pandemic, the opening World Cup event of 2021 Meiringen held 16–17 April 2021, was the first Boulder World Cup in 22 months, since Vail, Colorado in September 2019., and the first Climbing World Cup of any discipline since August 2020 in Briançon. Adam Ondra won the men's gold, his 20th career World Cup medal, with 3 tops in the final. On the women's side, Slovenia's Janja Garnbret continued her winning run from her unbeaten 2019 bouldering campaign, winning the competition by topping all boulders with just four falls while 16-year-old French climber Oriane Bertone made her senior competition debut with a second-place finish behind Garnbret.

Garnbret did not participate in the first of two World Cups in Salt Lake City held 21–22 May, bringing her streak of seven Boulder World Cup wins to an end. In her absence, Grossman won the gold, followed by Bertone, who again finished second, while Ondra repeated as the men's Boulder winner. Grossman repeated as the winner in the second Salt Lake City event, held 28–30 May, this time becoming the first woman to defeat Garnbret, who finished second, since April 2018. In the men's speed competition, Kiromal Katibin of Indonesia set a world record time of 5.258 seconds in qualifying, a record that was broken the same day by fellow Indonesian, Veddriq Leonardo, who hit the buzzer at 5.20 in the final run against Katibin.

Garnbret won all three Lead World Cups she entered in 2021, winning a record 31st World Cup gold medal in Kranj in September and taking the overall season title. On the men's side, Stefano Ghisolfi took the Lead season title, having won the event in Briançon in addition to two second places at the World Cups in Innsbruck and Chamonix, while Sean Bailey's two wins in Villars and Chamonix earned him second place in the overall Lead season ranking.

Broadcast incident 
Austrian broadcaster Osterreichischer Rundfunk (ORF) issued an apology during the Innsbruck World Cup, after showing slow-motion, close-up footage that zoomed on the chalk handprints on Johanna Färber's bottom on the event's live feed on YouTube. IFSC removed the video from its YouTube channel and replaced it a version without the footage. Färber later posted a message on her Instagram, calling the incident "disrespectful and upsetting"

Overview

Bouldering 

The overall ranking is determined based upon points, which athletes are awarded for finishing in the top 30 of each individual event. There were four competitions in the season. The national ranking is the sum of the points of that country's three best male and female athletes. Results displayed (in brackets) are not counted.

Men 
The results of the ten most successful athletes of the Bouldering World Cup 2021:

Women 
The results of the ten most successful athletes of the Bouldering World Cup 2021:

National Teams 
The results of the ten most successful countries of the Bouldering World Cup 2021:

Country names as used by the IFSC

* = Joint place with another athlete

Lead 

The overall ranking is determined based upon points, which athletes are awarded for finishing in the top 30 of each individual event. There were five competitions in the season. The national ranking is the sum of the points of that country's three best male and female athletes. Results displayed in parentheses are not counted.

Men 
The results of the ten most successful athletes of the Lead World Cup 2021:

Women 
The results of the ten most successful athletes of the Lead World Cup 2021:

National Teams 
The results of the ten most successful countries of the Lead World Cup 2021:

Country names as used by the IFSC

Speed 

The overall ranking is determined based upon points, which athletes are awarded for finishing in the top 30 of each individual event. There were two competitions in the season. The national ranking is the sum of the points of that country's three best male and female athletes. Results displayed (in brackets) are not counted.

Men 
The results of the ten most successful athletes of the Speed World Cup 2021:

Women 
The results of the ten most successful athletes of the Speed World Cup 2021:

National Teams 
The results of the ten most successful countries of the Speed World Cup 2021:

Country names as used by the IFSC

* = Joint place with another athlete

Medal table

See also 
Sport climbing at the 2020 Summer Olympics
2021 IFSC Climbing World Championships

References

IFSC Climbing World Cup
World Cup